Gjesdal is a Norwegian surname. Notable people with the surname include:

Frøystein Gjesdal (born 1956), Norwegian economist
Henrik Gjesdal (born 1993), Norwegian footballer
Kristin Gjesdal (born 1969), Norwegian philosopher
Tor Gjesdal (1909–1973), Norwegian journalist and civil servant

Norwegian-language surnames